Dietmar Hermann Heidemann (1967) is a German philosopher and Professor of Philosophy at the University of Luxembourg.
He is best known for his research on Kant and German idealism.
Heidemann is the editor-in-chief of Kant Yearbook.

Books
 Der Begriff des Skeptizismus: Seine systematischen Formen, die pyrrhonische Skepsis und Hegels Herausforderung, erscheint Berlin/New York 2007 („Quellen und Studien zur Philosophie“, De Gruyter)
 Kant und das Problem des metaphysischen Idealismus, Berlin/New York 1998 (Kantstudien Ergänzungsheft 131, De Gruyter)

Edited
 Join or Die: Philosophical Foundation of Federalism, Berlin/Boston 2016 (zusammen mit K. Stoppenbrink; De Gruyter)
 Kant and Non-Conceptual Content, London/New York 2013 (Routledge)
 Foi et savoir dans la philosophie moderne/Glaube und Vernunft in der Philosophie der Neuzeit, Hildesheim, Zürich, New York 2013 (zusammen mit R. Weicker, Olms)
 Hegel und die Geschichte der Philosophie, Darmstadt 2007 (zusammen mit Chr. Krijnen, Wissenschaftliche Buchgesellschaft)
 Ethikbegründungen zwischen Universalismus und Relativismus, Berlin/New York 2005 (zusammen mit K. Engelhard; De Gruyter)
 Warum Kant heute? Systematische Bedeutung und Rezeption seiner Philosophie in der Gegenwart, Berlin/New York 2004 (De Gruyter Studienbuch; zusammen mit K. Engelhard)
 Probleme der Subjektivität in Geschichte und Gegenwart, Stuttgart-Bad Cannstatt 2002

References

External links
Dietmar Heidemann at the University of Luxembourg

21st-century German philosophers
Philosophy academics
Living people
1967 births
Kant scholars
Academic staff of the University of Luxembourg
University of Cologne alumni
Metaphysicians